Cyber Trance presents ELT Trance is the first trance music remix album by Japanese duo Every Little Thing. It was released simultaneously with the house remixes compilation The Remixes III: Mix Rice Plantation on February 27, 2002, by Avex Trance. The album contains remixes of tracks from their first four studio albums from Everlasting to 4 Force.

All the remixes included in the album are edit versions. As of 2014, the original extended or alternate versions of the tracks remain unreleased, except for Airwave's  "Fragile", Svenson & Gielen's "Dear My Friend" extended club versions, and DJ Balloon's "Shapes of Love" dub mix version, which were included in Avex's miscellaneous compilations.

Track listing

Personnel
Audio mastering: Hiroyuki Hosaka
A&R: Nobby Uno
Assistant Direction: Hidetomo Yoneda, Tomohiro Kinukawa
Coordination In Europe: Satoshi Uetake
Coordination: Akiko Inoue, Cooney Kotani, Naoko Miura
Executive Supervisor: Shinji Hayashi
Special Coordination: Tom Yoda
Supervisor: Hidemi Arasaki, Katsuro Oshita, Shig Fujita

Chart positions

References

External links
 CYBER TRANCE Presents ELT TRANCE information at Avex Network.
 CYBER TRANCE Presents ELT TRANCE information at Oricon.
 CYBER TRANCE Presents ELT TRANCE information at Mora.jp (song length)

Every Little Thing (band) albums
2002 remix albums